Madhan may refer to:
 Madhan, Iranshahr (مدهان - Madhān)
 Madhan, Nik Shahr (مدحان - Madḩān)